Azygophleps godswindow is a moth in the family Cossidae. It is found in South Africa.

References

Moths described in 2011
Azygophleps